Clear Horizons Early College High School is a public secondary school located in Houston, Texas, United States. In this program, {{citation needed span|an associate degree is completed simultaneously within the student's four years of high school. The program requires all its students to be on either the Distinguished Achievement Plan or the Distinguished Level of Achievement Plan. Students must take the highest level classes offered for each subject (e.g. AP, PreAP, or Dual Credit classes). Dual credit classes are semi-free for the students and therefore the school is known for helping economically disadvantaged students. Acceptance into the school is based on random name drawing of applicants via lottery system based on grades.

History
Clear Horizons Early College High School was founded in 2007. The school is located on the South Campus of the San Jacinto Community College District. It is the successor of Clear Creek Independent School District's Project ExCEL.

Clear Horizons' first graduating class in 2009 consisted of 12 students. Four of these graduates received their associate degree.

References

External links
 

High schools in Harris County, Texas
Public high schools in Houston
Clear Creek Independent School District high schools
Educational institutions established in 2007
2007 establishments in Texas